Seyed Kazem Noor Mofidi (born 1940) is a Supreme Leader's representative in Golestan Province, the leader of congregational Friday prayers of Gorgan, and a member of the Assembly of Experts in Iran. He is considered the oldest Friday prayer leader in the country and the only representative of the reformist Supreme Leader in Iran.

Biography

Before Iran revolution 

Seyed Kazem Noor Mofidi was born in 1940. After elementary school, at the age of twelve, he studied religious sciences, and after four years of studying in Gorgan, he moved to Mashhad and from there to Qom. In the important centres of Islamic education, he studied religious sciences and attained the degree of ijtihad. Seyyed Ruhollah Khomeini, Mohaghegh Damad, Mohammad Ali Araki, Seyyed Mohammad Reza Golpayegani, Morteza Haeri Yazdi and Morteza Motahhari were among his professors.

Marriage 
In 1962, he married the sister of Mohammad Fazel Lankarani and he has three sons and a daughter.

Struggles 
Seyed Kazem Noor Mofidi was an activist in the fight against Pahlavi. He was once commissioned by Ruhollah Khomeini to deliver his message to the mullahs of Gorgan.

After Iran revolution
At the beginning of the Iranian Revolution, he became the head of the temporary committee of the youth revolution. In 1979, he was appointed as the Friday Imamate of Gorgan and the representative of Seyyed Ruhollah Khomeini in Gorgan and Dasht region. After Khomeini's death, the sentence of representing his supreme leader was enforced by Seyyed Ali Khamenei.

Career 
He is now the representative of the Vali-Faqih in Golestan province, leader of congregational Friday prayers, a member of the Assembly of experts, lecturer in the supreme and outside of the jurisprudence of Gorgan Seminary and the head of the Management Council of the Golestan Seminary.

See also 
 Mahmoud Hashemi Shahroudi
 Sadeq Larijani
 Abdul-Nabi Namazi
List of Ayatollahs
List of members in the First Term of the Council of Experts

References

External links 
 Official Website
 List of members of Assembly of Experts | Wikipedia
 List of provincial representatives appointed by Supreme Leader of Iran | Wikipedia
  Assembly of Experts | Official Website (Persian)
 1998 ASSEMBLY OF EXPERTS ELECTION
 2006 ASSEMBLY OF EXPERTS ELECTION

1940 births
Iranian Islamists
Members of the Assembly of Experts
Iranian ayatollahs
Living people
People from Gorgan